Wat Chaloem Phra Kiat Worawihan (literally: "Glorify Grand Temple"), or simple known as Wat Chaloem Phra Kiat is a Thai temple in the area of Bang Si Mueang Subdistrict, Mueang Nonthaburi District, Nonthaburi Province on the Chao Phraya River, regarded as an ancient temple that is older than 160 years old.

The temple is classified as the second rank of royal temple of province alike Wat Paramaiyikawat of Ko Kret. It was built in 1849 by King Nangklao (Rama III) to dedicated to his mother (Queen Consort Sri Sulalai) and grandparents who resided in this area. He gave the name "Wat Chaloem Phra Kiat" since it was not completed.  Somdet Chao Phraya Borom Maha Prayurawongse (Tish Bunnag) was a project director. The construction was not completed in the reign of King Nangklao due to his death. All construction was transferred to Prayurawongse's second son, Chaophraya Thiphakorawong (Kham Bunnag) in the reign of King Mongkut (Rama IV), construction was completed in 1858.

This temple has a unique characteristic, unlike other temples in Thailand, due to its border walls are fortified like the Grand Palace wall. This area was once the site of the old fort named "Pom Thapthim". These temple forts were restored in 1992.

Moreover, the ordination hall is also a combination of Thai-Chinese architectural styles, which is majestic scenery. Within the ordination hall, the principal Buddha statue Maravijaya was enshrined, named "Phra Buddha Maha Logapinantapatima". This Buddha statue was cast in the royal foundry, along with the principal Buddha statue of the Wat Ratchanatdaram in Rattanakosin Island.

In the south side is the grand sanctuary of temple, which is called "Wihan Sila Khao". The King Mongkut ordered to bring the another principal Buddha statue named "Phra Sila Khao" to place here in 1858. Nearby is also the site of the chapel, which is Thai-Chinese art as well, with "Phra Buddha Patima Chaiwat" or "Phra Chai Lang Chang" placed inside.  On the back of the chapel, there is the white pagoda stand out, this is the Langka style pagoda that height is 45 m (147.64 ft) and putting inside with the Buddha relics. 

The monument of King Nangklao is located along the Chao Phraya River behind the temple.

References

External links

Buddhist temples in Nonthaburi Province
Buildings and structures on the Chao Phraya River
Tourist attractions in Nonthaburi province
19th-century Buddhist temples
Religious buildings and structures completed in 1858